Frank A. "Red" McDermott (November 12, 1888 – September 11, 1964) was an American Major League Baseball left fielder who played in five games for the Detroit Tigers in .

As opposed to his short major league career, he had a long minor league career spanning 16 seasons and 26 years.  He began his professional career in 1908 with the Fort Wayne Billikens of the Central League.  With the exception of the 1918 season he played continuously through 1923, his last team being the Chambersburg Maroons of the Blue Ridge League.  He then retired, only to return for a single season with the 1934 Dayton Ducks of the Middle Atlantic League.

External links

1888 births
1964 deaths
Detroit Tigers players
Major League Baseball left fielders
Baseball players from Pennsylvania
Minor league baseball managers
Fort Wayne Billikens players
Providence Grays (minor league) players
Memphis Chickasaws players
Richmond Climbers players
Richmond Virginians (minor league) players
Shreveport Gassers players
Des Moines Boosters players
Jackson Red Sox players
Chambersburg Maroons players
Dayton Ducks players